Nesopupa plicifera is a species of very small, air-breathing land snail, a terrestrial pulmonate gastropod mollusk in the family Vertiginidae. This species is endemic to the United States.

References

Endemic fauna of the United States
Molluscs of the United States
Vertiginidae
Gastropods described in 1904
Taxa named by César Marie Félix Ancey
Taxonomy articles created by Polbot